Thoppil Anto (6 June 1940 – 4 December 2021) was an Indian theater, and playback singer, stage performer and music composer. He was prominent during the 1970s in Malayalam movies. He sang in Father Damien in (1963), Anubhavangale Nandi in (1976), Sneham Oru Pravaham in (1979) and Veenapoovu  in (1982). He served as a light music artist with the All-India Radio Thrissur in the 1960s.

Early life
Anto was born as the second child among three children to Thoppil Kunjappu (Chavittu natakam artist) and Eliyamma at Edapally, Kochi. He had his primary education at St. George High School, Edappally.

Career
Anto worked as a playback singer with N. N. Pillai's Nadaka Theater, Vishwa Keralakalasammithi, Kottayam, People's Theater, Kayamkulam and Cochin Samgamithra. He has sung for more than 1000 dramas. He started a music troupe called Cochin Bandor Orchestra and performed on many stages in India and abroad.

Personal life
Anto married Treesa Pynadath with whom he had four children: Mettilda, Anty George (Prem Sagar, music composer), Glancin Thoppil Antony (Gemologist) and Marydas (M'das thoppil anto, singer and music composer). He has a granddaughter, Rachel J. Amirtharaj who is a costume designer.

Filmography

Composer
 Maayaamayooram - Kalaapam	1998	
 Neethimaan - Kalaapam	1998	
 Kaakka penne - Kalaapam	1998	
 Neelakkadambin - Kalaapam	1998
 Sneha Prakasam- Christian Devotional
 Viyasakra- Devotional, (Kurisinte Vashi)
 Onapookalam- Festival Songs, Production : Century Cassettes
 Oana pookal- Festival Songs  Production : Century Cassettes
 Mappila Pattukal - Under the banner, Cochin Harishree (Harindran)
 Papa Song- In connection with the  Pope John Paul II visit in Kerala, 1986
 Irumudi-        Hindu Devotional, (Sabarimala Songs)
 Changampuzha Kavithakal - Musical version of Poet Shri. Changampuzha Krishnapillai's poems, Sung by  :P. Jayachandran, K. G. Markose, Janaki Devi etc.
 Raaja Hamsam - Folk Songs, Singers: Minmini, Balagopalan Thambi & Thoppil Anto
 Divya Darsanam - Devotional, Lyrics: Dr.Cheriyan Kunianthodath, C.M.I.
 Kripa Sooryan -  Christian Devotional, Lyrics by Dr. Cheriyan Kunianthodath, Sung by M'das (Marydas), 2015

As a singer
 Aadithyananayum - Ragging	1973, Music by M. K. Arjunan	
 Maanodum mala - Anubhavangale Nandi	1979, Music by G. Devarajan
 Maalaveppaan Vanniha - Veenapoovu	1983, Music by Vidyadharan	
 Ding Dong (Puthan Thalamura) - Ellaavarkkum Nanmakal (Puthan Thalamura)	1987
 Nummade Kochi : Honey Bee 2 2017 Music by Deepak Dev

Recognition
 Kerala Sangeetha Nataka Akademi Award for light music (1982)
 Pravasi Pranava Dhwani Puraskar (2010)
 Changampuzha Samskarika Kendram award

References

External links
 

Malayalam playback singers
Indian male playback singers
Singers from Kochi
Film musicians from Kerala
1940 births
2021 deaths
20th-century Indian male singers
20th-century Indian singers
21st-century Indian male singers
21st-century Indian singers
Recipients of the Kerala Sangeetha Nataka Akademi Award